Funagori Dam is a rockfill dam located in Yamaguchi prefecture in Japan. The dam is used for irrigation. The catchment area of the dam is 0.9 km2. The dam impounds about 7  ha of land when full and can store 540 thousand cubic meters of water. The construction of the dam was started on 1989 and completed in 2002.

References

Dams in Yamaguchi Prefecture
2002 establishments in Japan